The 1979 Cronulla-Sutherland Sharks season was the thirteenth in the club's history. They competed in the NSWRFL's 1979 Premiership and also won the 1979 Amco Cup.

Ladder

References

Cronulla-Sutherland Sharks seasons
Cronulla-Sutherland Sharks season
Cronulla-Sutherland Sharks season